A bivalve is a marine or freshwater mollusc with a shell composed of two valves.

Bivalve may also refer to three communities in the United States:
 Bivalve, Maryland
 Port Norris, New Jersey#Bivalve and Shell Pile